Mongolosaurus is a genus of titanosauriform sauropod dinosaur which lived during the Early Cretaceous of China.

Discovery and systematics
In 1928 a team from the American Museum of Natural History, headed by Roy Chapman Andrews, at On Gong Gol near Hukongwulong in Inner Mongolia, in Quarry 714 discovered a sauropod tooth. In 1933 Charles W. Gilmore, based on this fossil, named and described the type species Mongolosaurus haplodon. The generic name refers to Mongolia. The specific name is derived from Greek haploos, "single", and odon, "tooth".

The holotype, AMNH 6710, was found in the Early Cretaceous (Aptian-Albian) On Gong Formation. It consists of teeth, a basioccipital from the back of the skull and parts of the first three cervical vertebrae.

Although previously assigned to Diplodocidae, Titanosauridae and Euhelopodidae, recent studies find it to be either a basal titanosaur or a non-titanosaurian somphospondylan.

References

Macronarians
Early Cretaceous dinosaurs of Asia
Cretaceous China
Paleontology in Inner Mongolia
Taxa named by Charles W. Gilmore
Fossil taxa described in 1933